Sand Lake may refer to:

Places
United States
Sand Lake, Michigan, a village in Kent County, Michigan
Sand Lake, Iosco County, Michigan
Sand Lake, Minnesota, an unorganized territory in St. Louis County, Minnesota
Sand Lake Township, Itasca County, Minnesota
Sand Lake, New York, a town in Rensselaer County, New York
Sand Lake, Burnett County, Wisconsin, a town in Burnett County, Wisconsin
Sand Lake, Sawyer County, Wisconsin, a town in Sawyer County, Wisconsin
Sand Lake, Polk County, Wisconsin, an unincorporated community in Polk County, Wisconsin
Sand Lake (Anchorage), a section of Anchorage, Alaska

Lakes
Canada
 Sand Lake (Patterson Township, Ontario), Parry Sound District
 Sand Lake (Kearney, Ontario), Parry Sound District
 Sand Lake (Ontario), a list of many other lakes by this name

United States
 Sand Lake (Becker and Clay counties, Minnesota)
 Sand Lake, a lake in Nicollet County, Minnesota
 Sand Lake, a lake in Sibley County, Minnesota
 Sand Lake (Bisby Lakes, New York)
 Sand Lake (Oswegatchie SE, New York)

Other
Sand Lake National Wildlife Refuge in South Dakota
Sand Lake Recreation Area in Oregon in the Siuslaw National Forest